The 2014 EPZ Omloop van Borsele was the 12th running of the Omloop van Borsele, a women's cycling event in 's-Heerenhoek, the Netherlands.

Time trial

Road race

See also
2014 in women's road cycling

References

External links

Omloop van Borsele
EPZ Omloop van Borsele
EPZ Omloop van Borsele